Ebenfurth is a municipality in the district of Wiener Neustadt-Land in the Austrian state of Lower Austria. In 2010, Serbian folk singer Dragana Mirković and her husband Toni Bijelić bought Ebenfurth castle

Neighbouring municipalities 
 Neufeld an der Leitha (south-east, twinned city), Hornstein
 Eggendorf, Zillingdorf, Lichtenwörth (south)
 Haschendorf, Pottendorf (north)

Population

References

Cities and towns in Wiener Neustadt-Land District
Populated places on the Leitha
Twin cities